Nannocampus weberi, also known as the reef-flat pipefish is a species of marine fish belonging to the family Syngnathidae. They can be found inhabiting reefs in the Lesser Sunda Islands of Indonesia particularly the islands of Sumba and Bali. Their diet likely consists of small crustaceans such as copepods. Reproduction occurs through ovoviviparity in which the males brood eggs before giving live birth.

References

External links 

 Nannocampus weberi at FishBase

Syngnathidae
Fish described in 1915